NEPmen were businesspeople in the early Soviet Union, who took advantage of the opportunities for private trade and small-scale manufacturing provided under the New Economic Policy (NEP, 1921-1928). The famine of 1921–1922 epitomized the adverse effects of war communism, and to mitigate those effects, Vladimir Lenin instituted the NEP, which encouraged private buying and selling, with people even being encouraged to "enrich yourselves", as one Bolshevik leader, Nikolai Bukharin, put it. However, many Bolsheviks saw the policy as "a step backwards". That included Lenin himself, who defended the measure as "taking one step backward to take two steps forward later on".

The biggest group of the 3 million or so NEPmen were engaged in handicrafts in the countryside, but those who traded or ran small businesses in the cities faced the most negative attitudes, especially because some amassed considerable fortunes. One of the main objectives of the Communist Party was to promote socialism, and the capitalist behavior of the NEPmen challenged that goal. However, given the economic benefits that NEPmen provided, the government allowed their existence. As they gained a better standard of living compared to their poor, working class counterparts, NEPmen became reviled, and stereotyped as greedy. Among ordinary folk, traditional hatred of profiteers found focus in the NEPmen, some of it acquiring an antisemitic tinge. That was reinforced by the official media representation of NEPmen as vulgar nouveaux riches. As Joseph Stalin consolidated his power, he moved aggressively to end the NEP and to put NEPmen out of business, eventually abolishing private commerce in 1931.

Under Lenin 

When the NEP was introduced by Lenin in 1921, many NEPmen took advantage of the chance to establish themselves in Soviet society. Lenin's plan was to use the NEP as a temporary measure to rebuild the devastated Soviet economy. The NEPmen’s role in the new economic climate was to help spread trade to the parts of the country the government could not reach. In fact, in 1922 the NEPmen accounted for almost 75% of the Soviet Union's retail trade. However, not everyone in the country was happy about the NEP and the emergence of NEPmen. Many Bolsheviks saw the NEPmen as competition and feared that they would end up in positions of power, turning the Soviet Union into a capitalist nation. Lenin was highly criticized by his party members for the NEP because it was essentially capitalism controlled by the state. The disapproval of the NEP by many members of society greatly affected a NEPman’s quality of life. They were closely scrutinized and heavily taxed, and their right to vote was revoked. Socialist advertising was also produced to oppose the NEPmen's capitalistic activities, and this war on capitalism became one of the main goals of Soviet socialist advertising at the time.

Lenin combated this slander and disapproval by asserting that the NEP was just a temporary measure required to repair the Soviet’s crumbling economy. He also pointed out that the NEPmen were helping the economy because they could be heavily taxed, providing more revenue for the state. The increase in revenue would aid the government in securing its plans for a socialist society, while also strengthening the economy. In the eyes of those who supported the policy, NEPmen were nothing more than a stepping stone, providing stability for the creation of the Soviet socialist state in that era. However, by the time of Lenin’s death in 1924, the NEPmen were being phased out of society to make room for socialist values, and during the Stalin era, NEPman became a dying breed.

Under Stalin 
In 1922, Lenin had his second stroke, which affected his ability to lead. Before his death in 1924, an obvious power struggle between Stalin and Leon Trotsky had begun. Given the instability in Russian leadership, NEPmen gained a small window of opportunity. After a dramatic drop in sales directly from state industry to NEPmen (14.7% to 2.1%) in 1924, the Soviet economy once again relied heavily on NEPmen for stabilization. Decrees in 1925 and 1926 reduced taxes, state loans were no longer mandatory, and employee penalties were alleviated (i.e., lower number of employees, lower taxes). Although NEPmen enjoyed a more hospitable economic and social environment, it did not indicate that they were universally accepted, but rather tolerated. Stalin frequently expressed his disdain for the NEP and NEPmen. It was public knowledge that he was frustrated with members within the Communist Party who supported the policy. 

During Stalin's rise to power, his moderate position was opposed by both the anti-NEP left wing of the party led by Trotsky, and the pro-NEP right wing led by Bukharin. By October 1927, Zinoviev and Trotsky, Stalin's main opposition, had been removed from the Central Committee, and could no longer threaten Stalin. As a result, Stalin gained the maneuverability to propose a new economic strategy, and the freedom to develop means of eliminating private entrepreneurship. In 1928, Stalin reignited the attitudes of the October Revolution era, and aggressively propagated anti-NEPmen propaganda.

In the same year, the NEP was replaced by Stalin's Five Year Plan, suggesting that NEPmen would also be replaced. However, some scholars argue that a modified version of NEPmen existed into the 1930s. Nonetheless, with Stalin's increasingly unlimited power, tensions escalated, and force became an acceptable means of removing the wealthier class or the "enemy of the people".

See also
New Russians 
Kulak
New Soviet man

References

A History of Russia by Nicholas V. Riasanovsky and Mark D. Steinberg

Economy of the Soviet Union
1920s in the Soviet Union
Soviet phraseology
Social groups of Russia